Döhler is a global producer, marketer and provider of technology-based natural ingredients and ingredient systems, i.e. food additives, for the food and beverage industries. Their product line ranges from flavours, colours, specialty & performance ingredients, cereal ingredients, dairy ingredients, fruit & vegetable ingredients, and ingredient systems.

Headquartered in Darmstadt, Germany, Döhler has 23 production and 24 application centres, 50 sales offices, and sales representation in over 130 countries. More than 5,000 employees provide integrated food & beverage solutes from concept to realisation.

Döhler was founded by Lorenz Döhler in 1838 as a spice mill in Erfurt.

In 2021, Döhler and Sacco System formed an alliance in the plant-based dairy alternatives to produce new dairy-free yogurts, cheeses and drinks.

References 

Companies based in Hesse
Food and drink companies of Germany
Multinational companies headquartered in Germany